William Lamar may refer to:

William Bailey Lamar  (1853–1928), American  politician and lawyer from Florida
William H. Lamar (1859–1928), American lawyer and politician in Maryland
Bill Lamar (1897–1970), Major League Baseball player
William C. Lamar, United States Attorney in Mississippi